Chen Nan (born January 8, 1983) is a Chinese basketball player.

Chen was part of the Chinese teams that won gold medals at the 2002, 2006, and 2010 Asian Games. She competed at the 2004 Summer Olympics in Athens, the 2008 Summer Olympics in Beijing, and the 2012 Summer Olympics in London.

WNBA career
On April 28, 2009, she was signed onto the WNBA team Chicago Sky through the 2010 season.

References

1983 births
Living people
Basketball players at the 2004 Summer Olympics
Basketball players at the 2008 Summer Olympics
Basketball players at the 2012 Summer Olympics
Basketball players at the 2016 Summer Olympics
Basketball players from Qingdao
Chicago Sky players
Chinese expatriate basketball people in the United States
Chinese women's basketball players
Olympic basketball players of China
Asian Games medalists in basketball
Basketball players at the 2002 Asian Games
Basketball players at the 2006 Asian Games
Basketball players at the 2010 Asian Games
Centers (basketball)
Asian Games gold medalists for China
Medalists at the 2002 Asian Games
Medalists at the 2006 Asian Games
Medalists at the 2010 Asian Games
Chinese expatriate basketball people
Chinese expatriate sportspeople in South Korea
Expatriate basketball people in South Korea
Bayi Kylin players